Walter Heck was a German graphic designer who created the SS double rune symbol for the Nazi Schutzstaffel in 1929, the SA-Runes badge, and co-designed the all-black SS uniform in 1932. He was a company commander in the Sturmabteilung (SA), and later joined the SS.

Design of the SS symbol
Heck worked for Ferdinand Hoffstätter in Bonn, a company that made badges, and "worked in a studio focused on military designs."

In 1929, Heck designed the SS logo, not based on some ancient Aryan Germanic rune as mythologised by the Nazis, but because he wanted to  move away from the Fraktur lettering ubiquitous in Germany at the time and also thought that the capital "S" used in the standard Latin alphabet was too soft to represent the values of the SS. He may also have been influenced by the double lightning bolt symbol used to warn people of a dangerous high voltage which is similar to the symbol that Heck designed. He was paid  for his work (about $2). At the time, Heck was a company commander in the Sturmabteilung (SA), and would later join the SS. By 1944 he was an Obersturmführer.

In 1944, during the Second World War, a fellow officer wrote to Heinrich Himmler on Heck's behalf asking for some special consideration for Heck on account of the very small payment he had received for his design work on the SS symbol, and the fact that he was impoverished and had not retained any copyright on the design. Himmler wrote to Heck in response to say that, after the war was over, he intended to give Heck a family home with a garden but that he expected him to have started a family and have at least two children by then.

Other designs
Heck also designed the SA-Runes badge, a combination of a runic S and a Gothic A, and in 1932, with Karl Diebitsch, he designed the all-black SS uniform, not Hugo Boss as is often stated, although Boss's eponymous company, Hugo Boss AG, did manufacture them.

Legacy
In 2017, the German television channel ZDFinfo released a 50-minute documentary Signs of Evil – The Runes of the SS from Silke Potthoff, which explored the history of the "SS" symbol and Heck's role in its design.

References

Further reading

German graphic designers
Sturmabteilung officers
SS officers
German military personnel of World War II
Year of birth missing
Year of death missing